The Aircraft Builders Council (ABC) was founded in 1955 at a time when aviation products liability coverage was in its infancy and not readily available on the open markets. A group of aviation manufacturing companies, brokers and insurers developed a products liability insurance facility for the benefit of manufacturers in the aviation industry. The Aircraft Builders Council conducts a conference each year.

References

External links 
 Aircraft Builders Council Website

Aviation organizations
Organizations established in 1955
1955 establishments in the United States